Barton Broad is a   nature reserve north-east of Norwich in Norfolk. It is owned and managed by the Norfolk Wildlife Trust. It is part of the Ant Broads and Marshes Site of Special Scientific Interest and National Nature Reserve, and part of it is in the Ant Marshes Nature Conservation Review site, Grade I. It is part of the Broadland Ramsar site and Special Protection Area, and The Broads Special Area of Conservation.

The Broad was created in the Middle Ages by digging for peat and the River Ant was later diverted through it, which allowed navigation. It has diverse aquatic plants and fish, and the surrounding fens have nationally rare plants and invertebrates.

There is public access to the reserve.

References

Norfolk Wildlife Trust